Chandrakant Kavlekar (born 7 May 1971) also known as Babu Kavlekar is an Indian  politician and former Minister of Town and Country Planning, Agriculture, Archives, Archaeology, Factories and Boilers of Goa. He belongs to Dhangar caste. He was a four-term member of the Goa Legislative Assembly and represented  the Quepem constituency.

In the election for legislative assembly Kavlekar successfully won against BJP candidate Prakash Velip and was elected as MLA for fourth consecutive term.

On 11 July 2019 he left Indian National Congress and joined Bharatiya Janata Party. He was appointed Deputy Chief Minister on July 13, 2019.

References

External links
Members of the Goa Legislative Assembly 

Members of the Goa Legislative Assembly
Living people
Former members of Indian National Congress from Goa
People from South Goa district
Maharashtrawadi Gomantak Party politicians
Goa MLAs 2017–2022
Leaders of the Opposition in Goa
Bharatiya Janata Party politicians from Goa
1971 births
Deputy chief ministers of Goa